The Toro Rosso STR3 is a Formula One car which Scuderia Toro Rosso used in the 2008 Formula One season designed by Adrian Newey, the Red Bull Racing designer.

Sebastian Vettel, who (since joining Scuderia Toro Rosso) makes it a habit to give his racing cars names, named his STR 3 'Julie'.

Overview 
It was first tested by Red Bull junior driver, Brendon Hartley in Italy on 2 April and publicly launched on 16 April 2008 at the Circuit de Catalunya, where it was driven by Sébastien Bourdais.

Toro Rosso had started the 2008 season with an updated B specification version of their  STR2 car, originally stating that the STR3 would make its début at the fourth or fifth round.

The car was first raced at the 6th round of the season, the Monaco Grand Prix, driven by Sébastien Bourdais and Sebastian Vettel. It was driven by Vettel to victory in the Italian Grand Prix, the team's and Vettel's first victory.

BOSS GP

The STR3 driven by Vettel made its debut in the 2022 BOSS GP Series, driven by Thomas Jackermeier, the CEO of German sim racing hardware company Fanatec. He scored two second place finishes in the F1 Class at the Red Bull Ring.

Complete Formula One results
(key) (results in bold indicate pole position)

* 37 points scored with the STR3.

References

External links

Toro Rosso Formula One cars
2008 Formula One season cars